East Fourth Street Historic District is a registered historic district in Cincinnati, Ohio, listed in the National Register of Historic Places on February 22, 1988.  It contains a row of 3 side-by-side contributing buildings dating circa 1860.

The former headquarters Cincinnati Gas & Electric Company, completed in 1929, although not a contributing property, stands next door to the cluster of buildings at the southwest corner of Fourth and Main streets. Its tower can be seen in the left side of the image.

Notes 

 

Historic districts in Cincinnati
National Register of Historic Places in Hamilton County, Ohio
Historic districts on the National Register of Historic Places in Ohio